Yours Truly, Angry Mob is the second album by English rock band Kaiser Chiefs. It was released on 23 February 2007 in Belgium and the Netherlands, 26 February 2007 in the rest of the world by B-Unique Records and in March in North America by Universal Motown. Produced by Stephen Street, who produced the band's debut album Employment, Yours Truly, Angry Mob is lyrically darker and more socially aware than its predecessor, with tracks dealing with street crime, violence, fame, and the inaccuracy of tabloid articles. The song "Boxing Champ" features drummer Nick Hodgson on lead vocals.

Album information
The band revealed to NME in October 2006 that they had recorded 22 songs and hoped to whittle that number down to 13 or 14 for the final album. Additionally, in July 2006 the band revealed to Gigwise that they hoped to have the album released by Valentine's Day 2007. The album was preceded by the release of lead single "Ruby" on 19 February. It became the band's first, and to date, only, number one single on the UK Singles Chart. The album topped the UK Albums Chart and the band released the singles "Everything Is Average Nowadays" on 21 May 2007 and "The Angry Mob" on 20 August 2007. The final single "Love's Not a Competition (But I'm Winning)" was released as a collector's edition 7" single on 12 November 2007, with The Little Ones' cover of "Everything Is Average Nowadays" as a B-side.

Track listing

In Europe, Asia and America, "Learnt My Lesson Well" and "Boxing Champ" were added together to make one track, at a running time of 5:25.
In Japan, "Boxing Champ" and "Everything Is Average Nowadays" were added together to make one track, at a running time of 4:15.

Critical reception
Critical response to Yours Truly, Angry Mob was generally positive. At Metacritic, which assigns a normalized rating out of 100 to reviews from mainstream critics, the album has received an average score of 61, based on 29 reviews.

 Spin (p. 92) - 3.5 stars out of 5 -- "[The album] marches through its baker's dozen of punk-tinged pop songs with a prickly sense of purpose."
 Q magazine (p. 106) - 4 stars out of 5 -- "[T]he eccentric twists bolster Yours Truly's main thrust....The chorus among choruses belongs to the decidedly unaverage 'Everything Is Average Nowadays'..."
 Uncut (p. 80) - 4 stars out of 5 -- "[T]heir second album manages to be full of surprises, while never straying too far from what you'd expect."
 CMJ (p. 39) - "The band, in love as ever with the Britpop tradition that spawned them, offers another collection of swaggering uptempo guitar tracks that are full of big, singalong choruses..."
 Q magazine (p. 84) - Ranked #13 in Q's "The 50 Best Albums of 2007" -- "'The Angry Mob' was the definitive illustration of their maturing lyrical wit and musical brawn."
 Mojo (p. 98) - 4 stars out of 5 -- "Opener 'Ruby' is a foot-to-the-floor, festival monster-in-waiting, while 'Highroyds' recalls Blur's effervescent, buzzsaw pop."

Charts and certifications

Weekly charts

Year-end charts

Certifications

Release details

References

2007 albums
Albums produced by Stephen Street
Kaiser Chiefs albums
B-Unique Records albums